Holy Trinity Church in Much Wenlock, Shropshire, England. Located on Wilmore Street and dating to the early 12th century, it is now a Grade I listed building.

The oldest part is the nave, the south aisle and chapel and the tower were added in the late 12th century, and the chancel was later extended, doubling its length.  The church is built in stone, and consists of a nave, a south aisle and chapel, a south porch, a chancel, and a west tower.  The nave is Norman in style, and the chancel is early Perpendicular.  The tower has four stages, clasping buttresses, round-arched bell openings, and an embattled parapet.

Architect Samuel Pountney Smith added windows to the south aisle and the south chapel in 1843 and 1866.

See also
Listed buildings in Much Wenlock

References

Sources

Holy Trinity Church
Grade I listed churches in Shropshire
12th-century church buildings in England
Churches in Shropshire
Listed churches in England